Hugh Thomas Diaz Morgan (born 8 August 1968) is an American musician best known as the former frontman of rock/hip hop band Fun Lovin' Criminals. Morgan performs both vocals and guitar and combines rock, hip hop, jazz, reggae, and funk influences in his music. He is also a presenter for BBC Radio and has made film and TV appearances.

Early life
Morgan is an American, born to Puerto Rican-American and Irish-American parents. In his youth he committed petty crimes and dealt cocaine, and was arrested for doing so, whilst driving a stolen car.

Music career
In 1993, Morgan formed Fun Lovin' Criminals with Brian Leiser and Steve Borgovini.  They have released six studio albums, three of which made the top ten in the UK Albums Chart, and have scored eight top 40 hits in the UK Singles Chart.  On 12 November 2021, it was announced that Morgan had left the Fun Lovin' Criminals. In 2010, Morgan made a guest appearance in the music video of Plan B's single "Prayin', and in 2012, collaborated with JetTricks on the track "See Us Through" from their Better Than Real Life album. Also in 2012, Morgan released his début solo album Say It to My Face credited to Huey and the New Yorkers..

Appearances in other media

Writing
Morgan had a short-lived, ghost-written wine column for the British magazine Mondo from 2000 to 2001.

In June 2015, Morgan released his first book, Rebel Heroes: The Renegades of Music & Why We Still Need Them.

Television
In television, Morgan has appeared on the UK comedy music quiz show Never Mind the Buzzcocks, three times as a guest panelist and once as a guest host. In his most famous appearance, Morgan smashed a mug after becoming upset when needing to repeat lyrics from his songs in the Next Lines round. Morgan also participated in the BBC's The Underdog Show, where eight celebrities trained and rehabilitated rescued dogs. He is also a frequent guest panelist on the UK Channel 5 morning show The Wright Stuff. Morgan also made a guest appearance in an episode of Skins as Toxic Bob, the owner of a metal record shop. In 2010, Morgan co-hosted Liza & Huey's Pet Nation on Sky One with Liza Tarbuck. Morgan also hosted Slips on the British music channel Viva. More recent work includes narration for National Geographic's epic series Drugs Inc, now in its third series, voice overs for TV ads such as Blink Box and more. In 2015, Morgan began work on the Sky Arts show Guitar Stars, working with fellow DJ Edith Bowman, but left after the first series. On 3 November 2016, he appeared as a panelist on the BBC Television political debate programme Question Time. In April 2018, Morgan appeared on Million Pound Holiday Club on Channel 4 with stunt driver Ben Collins racing cars in the countryside.  In July 2020, Morgan hosted a 3 part series for BBC Four called "Huey Morgan's Latin Music Adventure", which saw Morgan travel to Brazil, Cuba and Puerto Rico, meeting famous musicians who shaped and inspired the sounds of Latin music.

Film
Morgan starred in Clubbing to Death with Craig Charles, Nick Moran, Dave Courtney, and Deepak Verma. He also played record shop proprietor Dee Dee in Soulboy, a dramatisation of the 1970s Northern Soul scene starring Martin Compston, Felicity Jones and Alfie Allen.  He starred in the 2000 film Once in the Life with Laurence Fishburne, playing the character Carlos as well as character called "The Yank" in the 2003 film, Headrush.

Voice-over
Morgan did a voice-over for the video game Scarface: The World Is Yours. He is the voice of National Geographic TV shows Drugs Inc and Underworld Inc as well as narrating the two-part BBC television documentary Blues America in 2013, which can be seen on YouTube. He has voiced radio ads for Wagamama since 2015, and in 2016, he voiced a global advertising campaign for Lynx (Axe) deodorant.

Radio
On 5 October 2008, Morgan began hosting his own radio show, "The Huey Show" on BBC Radio 6 Music. The show won a Bronze Award at the 2009 Sony Radio Academy Awards. The show currently broadcasts between 10:00 am and 1:00 pm on Saturdays.

Since April 2011, Morgan has hosted an array of shows on BBC Radio 2, beginning with Saturday 12:00 am - 3:00 am, replacing the show's previous host Mark Lamarr. He presented between 4:00 am and 6:00 am on Saturdays until 24 April 2021.

Other business ventures
Morgan previously co-owned The Voodoo Lounge, The Dice Bar and DiFontaine's Pizza Place in Dublin.  Morgan also opened Notting Hill Tattoo Studio, Love Hate Social Club with New York Tattoo Artist Ami James in November 2012.

Personal life
Morgan has previously lived in New York City, Dublin, Hawaii, London, Frome in Somerset and now lives in Bath. He married his wife Rebecca, an agent, in 2007; they have a son named Beaumont.

References

External links
 Official Website of Huey Morgan
 The Huey Show presents The Hip Hop Mixtape (BBC Radio 6 Music)
 The Huey Show (BBC Radio 6 Music)
 BLOCK PARTY with Huey Morgan (BBC Radio 6 Music)

BBC Radio 2 presenters
American expatriates in the United Kingdom
American people of Irish descent
American people of Puerto Rican descent
Living people
Musicians from New York City
BBC Radio 6 Music presenters
1968 births